Lourdes Mohedano Sanchez de Mora (born 17 June 1995 in Córdoba) is a Spanish group rhythmic  gymnast.

Career 
Mohedano represents her nation at international competitions. She participated at the 2012 Summer Olympics. She also competed at world championships, including at the 2015  World Rhythmic Gymnastics Championships where she won the bronze medal in the all-around event. In 2016, she got a silver medal in the Rio Olympic Games, as the second best rhythm gymnastics group. 

Mohedano competed at the 2016 Summer Olympics in Rio de Janeiro, Brazil where she was member of the Spanish group (together with Elena López, Artemi Gavezou, Sandra Aguilar, Alejandra Quereda) that won silver medal in group-all around.

Detailed Olympic results

References

External links
 
 
 
 
 

1995 births
Living people
Spanish rhythmic gymnasts
Place of birth missing (living people)
Gymnasts at the 2012 Summer Olympics
Olympic gymnasts of Spain
Gymnasts at the 2015 European Games
European Games competitors for Spain
Gymnasts at the 2016 Summer Olympics
Olympic silver medalists for Spain
Medalists at the Rhythmic Gymnastics World Championships
Medalists at the Rhythmic Gymnastics European Championships
21st-century Spanish women